The list below contains historical Ottoman mosques in modern-day İzmir, Turkey.

The table 

In the table below the first column shows the name, the second column shows the location, the third column shows the commissioner, the fourth column shows the architect and the fifth column shows the duration of construction.

Other Ottoman Mosques
Kemeralti (18th century)
Sadirvan (1636)
Fazıl Ahmet Pasa (Balık Pazarı) (17th century) (destroyed in 1922 fire)
Bölük-bası Mehmet Efendi (Hacı Mehmet Efendi)  (1661) (destroyed)
Altı-parmak (1649) (destroyed)
Acemler (17th century) (destroyed)
Arnavutoğlu (17th century) (destroyed)
Hatuniye (17th century)

 
Mosques in Izmir
Izmir
Mosques in Izmir